Andreu Matos Muñoz (born 1 December 1995) is an Andorran footballer currently playing as a forward for FC Santa Coloma of the Primera Divisió.

Career statistics

Club

Notes

International

References

External links
 UEFA Profile

1995 births
Living people
Andorran footballers
Andorran expatriate footballers
Association football forwards
FC Santa Coloma players
FC Andorra players
UE Engordany players
FC Encamp players
Inter Club d'Escaldes players
Andorra international footballers
Andorran expatriate sportspeople in Spain
Expatriate footballers in Spain
Andorra under-21 international footballers
Andorra youth international footballers